St Mirren competed for their fourth successive season in the Scottish Premier League after finishing 11th place for season 2008–09, narrowly avoiding relegation on goal difference. It will also be their first full season in their new home ground, since moving from Love Street in January. Saints won their first league match at their new home with a 2–1 victory over Heart of Midlothian on 3 October 2009.

Transfers

In

Out

Loan in

Source

Loan out

Source

Results

Scottish Premier League

League results by opponent

Source: 2009–10 Scottish Premier League article

Scottish Cup

League Cup

Friendlies

Competitions

Overall

SPL

Classification

Results by round

See also
List of St Mirren F.C. seasons

References

St Mirren F.C. seasons
Saint Mirren